Iisalmen Peli-Karhut is a Finnish semi-professional ice hockey team based in Iisalmi, Finland, playing in the Mestis. The club was founded in 1966 and play their home games in the Kankaan jäähalli.

Current roster

|}

References

External links
Official site 

Ice hockey teams in Finland
Ice hockey clubs established in 1966
1966 establishments in Finland